The 2011 DEKALB Superspiel was held November 24 to 27 at the Morris Curling Club in Morris, Manitoba, as part of the 2011–12 World Curling Tour. The event featured 16 men's teams and 15 women's teams competing in a triple knockout format. The purses for the event were CAD$30,000 for the men's event and CAD$24,000 for the women's event.

Men

Teams

Knockout results

A event

B event

C event

Playoffs

Women

Teams

Knockout results

A-Event

B-Event

C-Event

Playoffs

References

External links

DEKALB Superspiel (November)
Curling in Manitoba
2011 in Manitoba